Ella Sophonisba Hergesheimer (January 7, 1873 – June 24, 1943) was an American illustrator, painter, and printmaker who painted and illustrated Tennessee society, including the state's women and children. As a printmaker, she pioneered the white-line woodcut.

Early life

Hergesheimer was born in Allentown, Pennsylvania on January 7, 1873. Her parents were Charles P. Hergesheimer and Ellamanda Ritter Hergesheimer. She was encouraged to create art in her childhood.

Hergesheimer was the great-great granddaughter of Philadelphia artist Charles Willson Peale, who named one of his daughters Sophonisba after the Italian artist, Sofonisba Anguissola. Hergesheimer chose to use Sophonisba as her first name.

Education
She studied at the Philadelphia School of Design for Women for two years, and then went on to study at the Pennsylvania Academy of Fine Arts for four years. At the Pennsylvania Academy of Fine Arts, she studied with Cecilia Beaux, Hugh Breckenridge, and William Merritt Chase. She was considered by Chase to be one of his finest students, and spent the summer of 1900 studying at Chase's Shinnecock Hills Summer School of Art on Long Island. As a senior at the Pennsylvania Academy of Fine Arts, she was judged the best pupil in her class and was awarded the Cresson Traveling Scholarship.

This allowed her to study abroad in Europe for three years, where she trained at the Académie Colarossi and exhibited at the Paris Salon. She is listed among the students of Blanche Lazzell, who was known for her white-line color woodcuts.

Career
As a result of having her work including in a 1905 traveling exhibition organized by the Nashville Art Association, she received a commission in 1907 to paint the portrait of Holland Nimmons McTyeire, the Methodist bishop who convinced Cornelius Vanderbilt to endow Vanderbilt University. To work on the commission, she relocated to Nashville, Tennessee, where she remained the rest of her life - first occupying a studio on Church Street, and later one at Eighth Avenue and Broadway. She spoke fondly of the region and its residents, stating: "The country around Nashville is, some of it, the most beautiful I have ever seen––a large and bounteous field for the landscape painter. There are hosts of beautiful women and children and strong, fine men to inspire great portraits."

She also conducted art classes in Bowling Green, Kentucky, where her circle of friends included fellow artists Frances Fowler, Sarah Peyton, and Wickliffe Covington. She also maintained a lifelong friendship with landscape painter Orlando Gray Wales, who also was raised in Allentown and also studied at the Pennsylvania Academy of Fine Arts.

Hergesheimer's most notable portraits are those of Speaker of the House Joseph W. Byrns, Sr., which hangs in the United States Capitol building, and of Commodore Matthew Fontaine Maury, which hangs in Maury Hall at the United States Naval Academy in Annapolis, Maryland.

Though portraiture was her primary source of income, Hergesheimer experimented in other painting genres and artistic techniques, including printmaking, which she pursued alongside the artist Blanche Lazzell.

Death
Hergesheimer died on June 24, 1943 in Davidson County, Tennessee.

Awards
Gold medal, Appalachian Exposition (1910)
Gold medal, Tennessee State Exposition (1926)

Major exhibitions
American Artists Professional League
Art Institute of Chicago
Corcoran Gallery of Art
National Academy of Design
New Orleans Art Association
Pennsylvania Academy of the Fine Arts
 Salons of America
Sesquicentennial Exposition, Philadelphia, Pennsylvania (1926)
Society of Independent Artists

Colleagues and affiliations 
American Artists Professional League
American Federation of Arts
National Arts Club
New Orleans Art Association
Salons of America
Society of Independent Artists
Southern States Art League
Washington, D.C. Watercolor Club

Collections
Some of the major collectors of Hergesheimer's work are:
Heckscher Museum of Art, Huntington, New York
Morris Museum of Art, Augusta, Georgia
Reading Public Museum, Reading, Pennsylvania
Tennessee State Museum, Nashville, Tennessee
United States Capitol, Washington, D.C.
Vanderbilt University, Nashville, Tennessee
Two Red Roses Foundation, Palm Harbor, Florida

References

Further reading
Burton, Vincent. "Some Portraits by Ella S. Hergesheimer." International Studio 37 (March 1909): 32-33.
Kelly, James C. "Ella Sophonisba Hergesheimer 1873-1943." Tennessee Historical Quarterly 44 (Summer 1985): 112-13.
Knowles, Susan. "Ella Sophonisba Hergesheimer (1873-1943)." Distinctive Women of Nashville. Nashville: Tennessee Historical Society, 1985.

External links

1873 births
1943 deaths
Artists from Allentown, Pennsylvania
19th-century American painters
20th-century American painters
19th-century American women artists
20th-century American women artists
Académie Colarossi alumni
American women painters
Artists from Tennessee
Painters from Pennsylvania
Pennsylvania Academy of the Fine Arts alumni
Philadelphia School of Design for Women alumni
Peale family
People from Nashville, Tennessee
Society of Independent Artists
Students of William Merritt Chase